Arjestan Rural District is in Sabalan District of Sareyn County, Ardabil province, Iran. At the census of 2006, its constituent villages were in Sareyn District of Ardabil County before the establishment the district as a county. There were 3,269 inhabitants in 941 households at the following census of 2011, by which time Sabalan District was formed in the new county of Sareyn. At the most recent census of 2016, the population of the rural district was 3,097 in 899 households. The largest of its eight villages was Sain, with 947 people.

References 

Sareyn County

Rural Districts of Ardabil Province

Populated places in Ardabil Province

Populated places in Sareyn County

fa:دهستان ارجستان